William Andrew Kelleher (December 13, 1888 – November 27, 1961) was an American football player and coach. He served as the head football coach at Kenyon College in Gambier, Ohio from 1915 to 1916, compiling a record of 5–13. He played college football at the University of Notre Dame and professionally for the Massillon Tigers and Youngstown Patricians of the Ohio League. A native of Ireland, Kelleher worked for 35 years as a Lorain Works, National Tube Division, a part of U.S. Steel. He died on November 27, 1961, at his home in Lorain, Ohio.

Head coaching record

References

External links
 

1888 births
1961 deaths
American football halfbacks
American football fullbacks
Guards (basketball)
Kenyon Lords football coaches
Massillon Tigers players
Notre Dame Fighting Irish football players
Notre Dame Fighting Irish men's basketball players
Youngstown Patricians players
U.S. Steel people
People from Macroom
Irish emigrants to the United States (before 1923)